was a town located in Senboku District, Akita Prefecture, Japan.

As of 2003, the town had an estimated population of 8,258 and a density of 94.29 persons per km². The total area was 87.58 km².

On November 1, 2004, Senhata, along with the town of Rokugō and the village of Sennan (all from Senboku District), merged to create the town of Misato.

External links
 Official website of Misato

Dissolved municipalities of Akita Prefecture